Spiritus Sanctus Academies is a group of private schools based in southeastern Michigan teaching the Roman Catholic faith and regular classes founded by Thomas Monaghan and run by the Sisters of Mary, Mother of the Eucharist. Currently, there are two active schools. One school was built in California, but still is waiting for applications for Transitional Kindergarten & Kindergarten, to be activated in February 2008. One is situated close to Dominos World Resource Center, the headquarters of Domino's Pizza, and the other is located at Plymouth, Michigan.

History 

The Academies were founded by the entrepreneur, Catholic philanthropist, and billionaire Tom Monaghan after his religious awakening. He met with the Dominican Sisters of Mary, Mother of the Eucharist and collaborated with them to establish the first academy  in Ann Arbor, Michigan. The Academies grew and started forming schools at Ypsilanti, Michigan, Plymouth, Michigan, and Ann Arbor, Michigan.

Today 

All three campuses continued after Tom Monaghan withdrew financial support  from the school leaving the Dominican sisters with the school. Each school is receiving about three hundred students. A new school in Granite Bay, California opened in the fall of 2008, started up by a mission of the Dominican Sisters of Mary, Mother of the Eucharist stationed at California.

Websites 
 Spiritus Sanctus Academy (Michigan) Website
 Spiritus Sanctus Academy (California) Website

Private schools in Michigan
Catholic schools in the United States